Ski wax is a material applied to the bottom of snow runners, including skis, snowboards, and toboggans, to improve their coefficient of friction performance under varying snow conditions. The two main types of wax used on skis are glide waxes and grip waxes. They address kinetic friction—to be minimized with a glide wax—and static friction—to be achieved with a grip wax. Both types of wax are designed to be matched with the varying properties of snow, including crystal type and size, and moisture content of the snow surface, which vary with temperature and the temperature history of the snow. Glide wax is selected to minimize sliding friction for both alpine and cross-country skiing. Grip wax (also called "kick wax") provides on-snow traction for cross-country skiers, as they stride forward using classic technique.

Modern plastic materials (e.g. high-modulus polyethylene and Teflon), used on ski bases, have excellent gliding properties on snow, which in many circumstances diminish the added value of a glide wax. Likewise, uni-directional textures (e.g. fish scale or micro-scale hairs) underfoot on cross-country skis can offer a practical substitute for grip wax for those skiers, using the classic technique.

History 

Johannes Scheffer in Argentoratensis Lapponiæ (History of Lapland) in 1673 gave what is probably the first recorded instruction for ski wax application He advised skiers to use pine tar pitch and rosin. Ski waxing was also documented in 1761. In 1733 the use of tar was described by Norwegian colonel Jens Henrik Emahusen. In the 1740s Sami people use of resin and tallow under their skis is recorded in writing.

Beginning around 1854, California gold rush miners held organized downhill ski races. They also discovered that ski bases, smeared with lubricants brewed from vegetable and/or animal compounds, increased speed. This led to some of the first commercial ski lubricants, such as Black Dope and Sierra Lighting; both were mainly composed of sperm oil, vegetable oil and pine pitch. However, some instead used paraffin candle wax that melted onto ski bases, and these worked better under colder conditions.

Pine tar on wooden ski bases proved effective for using skis as transport over the centuries, because it fills the pores of the wood and creates a hydrophobic surface that minimizes suction from water in the snow, yet has sufficient roughness to allow traction for forward motion. In the 1920s and 30s, new varnishes were developed by European companies as season-long ski bases. A significant advance for cross country racing was the introduction of klister, for good traction in granular snow, especially in spring conditions; klister was invented and patented in 1913 by Peter Østbye. In the early 1940s, a Swedish chemical company, advised by Olympic crosscountry skier Martin Matsbo, started the development of petroleum-based waxes, using paraffin wax and other admixtures. By 1952, such noted brands as Toko, Swix and Rex were providing an array of color-coded, temperature-tailored waxes.

In the last quarter of the 20th century, researchers addressed the twin problems of water and impurities adhering to skis during spring conditions. Terry Hertel addressed both problems, first with the novel use of a surfactant that interacted with the wax matrix in such a way as to repel water effectively, a product introduced in 1974 by Hertel Wax. Hertel also developed the first fluorocarbon product and the first spring-time wax that repels and makes the running surface slick for spring time alpine ski and snowboard. This technology was introduced to the market in 1986 by Hertel Wax.  In 1990, Hertel filed for a U.S. patent on a "ski wax for use with sintered-base snow skis", containing paraffin, a hardener wax, roughly 1% per-fluoroether diol, and 2% SDS surfactant. Trademarks for Hertel waxes are Super HotSauce, Racing FC739, SpringSolution and White Gold. In the 1990s, Swix chief chemist Leif Torgersen found a glide wax additive to repel pollen and other snow impurities—a problem with soft grip waxes during distance races—in the form of a fluorocarbon that could be ironed into the ski base. The solution was based on the work of Enrico Traverso at Enichem SpA, who had developed a fluorocarbon powder with a melting temperature just a few degrees below that of sintered polyethylene, patented in Italy as a "ski lubricant comprising paraffinic wax and hydrocarbon compounds containing a perfluorocarbon segment".

Science of sliding on snow

The ability of a ski or other runner to slide over snow depends on both the properties of the snow and the ski to result in an optimum amount of lubrication from melting the snow by friction with the ski—too little and the ski interacts with solid snow crystals, too much and capillary attraction of meltwater retards the ski.

Friction
Kinetic (or dynamic) friction occurs when the ski is moving over the snow. The coefficient of kinetic friction, is less than the coefficient of static friction for both ice and snow. The force required for sliding on snow is the product of the coefficient of kinetic friction and the normal force: . Both the static and kinetic coefficients of friction increase with colder snow temperatures (also true for ice).

Snow properties

Snowflakes have a wide range of shapes, even as they fall; among these are: six-sided star-like dendrites, hexagonal needles, platelets and icy pellets. Once snow accumulates on the ground, the flakes immediately begin to undergo transformation (called metamorphism), owing to temperature changes, sublimation, and mechanical action. Temperature changes may be from the ambient temperature, solar radiation, rainwater, wind, or the temperature of the material beneath the snow layer. Mechanical action includes wind and compaction. Over time, bulk snow tends to consolidate—its crystals become truncated from breaking apart or losing mass with sublimation directly from solid to gas and with freeze-thaw, causing them to combine as coarse and granular ice crystals. Colbeck reports that fresh, cold, and man-made snow all interact more directly with the base of a ski and increase friction, indicating the use of harder waxes. Conversely, older, warmer, and denser snows present lower friction, in part due to increased grain size, which better promotes a water film and a smoother surface of the snow crystals for which softer waxes are indicated.

Ski friction properties
Colbeck offers an overview of the five friction processes of skis on snow. They are the: 1) resistance due to plowing of snow out of the way, 2) deformation of the snow over which the ski is traveling, 3) lubrication of the ski with a thin layer of melt water, 4) capillary attraction of water in the snow to the ski bottom, and 5) contamination of the snow with dust and other non-slippery elements. Plowing and deformation pertain to the interaction of the ski, as a whole, with the snow and are negligible on a firm surface. Lubrication, capillary attraction and contamination are issues for the ski bottom and the wax that is applied to reduce sliding friction or achieve adequate grip.

Typically, a sliding ski melts a thin and transitory film of lubricating layer of water, caused by the heat of friction between the ski and the snow in its passing. Colbeck suggests that the optimum water film thickness is in the range between 4  and 12 μm. However, the heat generated by friction can be lost by conduction to a cold ski, thereby diminishing the production of the melt layer. At the other extreme, when the snow is wet and warm, heat generation creates a thicker film that can create increased capillary drag on the ski bottom. Kuzmin and Fuss suggest that the most favorable combination of ski base material properties to minimize ski sliding friction on snow include: increased hardness and lowered thermal conductivity of the base material to promote meltwater generation for lubrication, wear resistance in cold snow, and hydrophobicity to minimize capillary suction. These attributes are readily achievable with a PTFE base, which diminishes the value added by glide waxes. Lintzén reports that factors other than wax are much more important in reducing friction on cross-country skate skis—the curvature of the ski and snow conditions.

Glide wax 
Glide wax can be applied to alpine skis, snowboards, skate skis, classic skis, back-country skis, and touring skis.  Traditional waxes comprise solid hydrocarbons. High-performance "fluorocarbon" waxes also contain fluorine, which substitutes some fraction of the hydrogen atoms in the hydrocarbons with fluorine atoms to achieve lower coefficients of friction and higher water repellency than the pure hydrocarbon wax can achieve. Wax is adjusted for hardness to minimize sliding friction as a function of snow properties, which include the effects of:
Age: Reflects the metamorphism of snow crystals that are sharp and well-defined, when new, but with aging become broken or truncated with wind action or rounded into ice granules with freeze-thaw, all of which affects a ski's coefficient of friction.
Moisture content: The percentage of mass that is liquid water and may create suction friction with the base of the ski as it slides.
Temperature: Affects the ease with which sliding friction can melt snow crystals at the interface between ski and snow.

Properties
A variety of glide waxes are tailored for specific temperature ranges and other snow properties with varying wax hardness and other properties that address repellence of moisture and dirt. The hardness of the glide wax affects the melting of the snow to lubricate its passage over the surface and its ability to avoid suction from meltwater in the snow. Too little melting and sharp edges of snow crystals or too much suction impede the passage of the ski. Harder waxes address colder, drier or more abrasive snow conditions, whereas softer waxes have a lower coefficient of friction, but abrade more readily. Wax formulations combine three types of wax to adjust coefficient of friction and durability. From hard to soft, they include synthetic waxes with 50 or more carbon atoms, microcrystalline waxes with 25 to 50 carbon atoms and paraffin waxes with 20 to 35 carbon atoms. Additives to such waxes include graphite, teflon, silicon, fluorocarbons, and molybdenum to improve glide and/or reduce dirt accumulation.

Application
Glide wax can be applied cold or hot. Cold applications include, rubbing hard wax like a crayon, applying a liquid wax or a spray wax. Hot applications of wax include the use of heat from an iron, infrared lamp, or a "hot box" oven.

Base material
The role of glide wax is to adapt and improve the friction properties of a ski base to the expected snow properties to be encountered on a spectrum from cold crystalline snow to saturated granular snow.  Modern ski bases often are made from ultra-high-molecular-weight polyethylene (UHMWPE). Kuzmin asserts that UHMWPE is non-porous and can hold neither wax nor water, so there is no possibility for filling pores; furthermore, he asserts that UHMWPE is very hydrophobic, which means that wet snow does not appreciably retard the ski and that glide wax offers little additional ability to repel water. He notes that clear bases are more durable and hydrophobic than those with carbon content. The same author asserts that texture is more important than surface chemistry for creating the optimum balance between a running surface that's too dry (not slippery enough) and too wet (ski subject to suction forces). In warm, moist snow, texture can help break the retarding capillary attraction between the ski base and the snow. Giesbrecht agrees that low wetting angle of the ski base is key and also emphasizes the importance of the degree of surface roughness at the micrometre scale as a function of snow temperature—cold snow favoring a smoother surface and wetter, warmer snow favoring a textured surface. Some authors question the necessity to use any glide waxes on modern ski bases.

Grip wax 

Cross-country skiers use a grip wax (also called "kick wax") for classic-style waxable skis to provide traction with static friction on the snow that allows them to propel themselves forward on flats and up hills. They are applied in an area beneath the skier's foot and extending, somewhat forward, that is formed by the camber of the classic ski, called the "grip zone" (or "kick zone"). The presence of camber allows the skis to grip the snow, when the weight is on one ski and the ski is fully flexed, but minimize drag when the skis are weighted equally and are thus less than fully flexed.  Grip waxes are designed for specific temperature ranges and types of snow; a correctly selected grip wax does not appreciably decrease the glide of skis that have proper camber for the skier's weight and for the snow conditions. There are two substances used for grip wax: hard wax and klister.
 Hard wax: a traditionally paraffin wax-based substance with admixtures—for snow comprising crystals that are relatively intact and not substantially changed by packing or freeze-thaw. The admixtures, which include a dye, rubber, rosin, resin and colophony, adjust the hardness of the wax to tailor the effectiveness of its grip for specific, discrete temperature ranges (from approximately -25 °F to +35 °F); waxes are graded and color-coded according to these temperature ranges. Harder grip waxes are designed for colder snow temperatures, but grip poorly in warm temperatures. Conversely, softer waxes in cold temperatures create enough friction and melting that the melt layer may accumulate and promote frozen accretion of snow.

 Klister: a sticky ointment, which may contain a combination of rosins, waxes, solvents and fats—with the formulation tailored for snow that comprises coarse crystals, having been transformed through freeze-thaw or being wind-blown, and adjusted for specific temperature ranges. Spray-on klister is more convenient than klister applied from a tube. An incorrect match of klister to snow conditions can also cause icing.

Some skis are "waxless", having a fish-scale or other texture to prevent the ski from sliding backwards. Ski mountaineers use temporarily adhered climbing skins to provide uphill grip, but typically remove them for descent.

Wax solvents 

Wax can be dissolved by non-polar solvents like mineral spirits. However, some commercial wax solvents are made from citrus oil, which is less toxic, harder to ignite, and gentler on the ski base.

Health and environmental effects

Health 

Ski wax may contain chemicals with potential health affects including per- and polyfluoroalkyl substances (PFASs). Levels of perfluorinated carboxylic acids, especially perfluorooctanoic acid (PFOA), have been shown to increase in ski wax technicians during the ski season.

Environment 

When skiing, the friction between the snow and skis causes wax to abrade and remain in the snow pack until spring thaw. Then the snowmelt drains into watersheds, streams, lakes and rivers, thereby changing the chemistry of the environment and the food chain. PFASs in ski wax are heat resistant, chemically and biologically stable, and thus environmentally persistent. They have been shown to accumulate in animals that are present at ski venues. The International Ski Federation (FIS) announced to introduce a ban on PFASs in waxes in all competitive ski disciplines from the winter season of 2020/21.

References

Further reading 
 

 

Non-petroleum based lubricants
Skiing equipment
Waxes